
Westcott may refer to:

Places

United Kingdom

Westcott, Buckinghamshire
 Rocket Propulsion Establishment
 RAF Westcott
Westcott, Devon
Westcott, Surrey
Westcott Barton, Oxfordshire
Westcott House, Cambridge, a theological college affiliated to the University of Cambridge

United States
 Westcott, Missouri, a ghost town
Westcott, Syracuse, a neighborhood in Syracuse, New York
Westcott, Rhode Island, a neighborhood in West Warwick, Rhode Island
Westcott House (Springfield, Ohio), a Frank Lloyd Wright designed house in Springfield, Ohio
Westcott Bay, San Juan Islands, Washington

People
Westcott (surname)

Others
Westcott factors two factors g and s describing neutron capture. Named after  Carl H. Westcott.
Westcott (automobile) (United States, 1920s)
J. W. Westcott II, a mailboat operated out of Detroit, Michigan, USA
Westcott Rule Company, an office supply company that specializes in rulers

See also
 Wescott (disambiguation)